Coppersmith is a surname. Notable people with the surname include:

Barbara Carole Coppersmith (1925–2017), birth name of American pianist Barbara Carroll
Don Coppersmith (b. 1950), cryptographer and mathematician
Louis Coppersmith (1928–1989), American politician
Sam Coppersmith (b. 1955), former United States Congressman
Susan Coppersmith (b. 1957), American physicist
Yvette Coppersmith (born 1980), Australian artist

English-language surnames
Occupational surnames
English-language occupational surnames